Banna Chluain Meala (literally translating as 'Clonmel band') is an Irish marching band which was founded in 1971.

References

External links
 

Musical groups from County Tipperary
Clonmel
Musical groups established in 1971
Concert bands
Marching bands